The Studentencodex is the most widely used commercium book in the Flemish part of Belgium.

Most students use the editions published by the Katholiek Vlaams Hoogstudentenverbond (KVHV), which is composed of three parts: the corpsboek with songs of the most fraternities, the clubcodex (blue pages) and a part of more than three hundred songs. It is published in two editions: one with a green cover by the KVHV of Leuven (used in the provinces of Flemish Brabant, Limburg, and Antwerp) and one with a blue cover by the KVHV of Ghent (used in East and West Flanders). Since the edition of 1993, they feature a common clubcodex and song part but have a different corpsboek.

In Brussels, students of the Vrije Universiteit Brussel and the Erasmus University College use their own codex with a black cover, which contains no religious songs in it due to the pluralistic position of these institutions of higher education.

External links

Pk.be, List of songs (and lyrics) listed in the Brussels' codex

Commercium songs
Student societies in Belgium
Student societies in the Netherlands